Ferdinand Haberl (15 March 1906 – 3 July 1985) was a German Catholic theologian, composer, musicologist, organist and choir director.

Life 
Born in Lintach, Haberl studied theology and musicology in Munich and Regensburg from 1926. In 1931, he received his holy orders. He then worked as pastor and music prefect in Schönwald before continuing his studies in Munich from 1933 to 1934. From 1934 to 1938, he was organist at the German national church Pontifical Institute Santa Maria dell' Anima in Rome. In 1939, he received his doctorate in theology in Munich. Afterwards, he took over the direction of the church music school in Regensburg. From 1964, he was an honorary professor at the University of Regensburg. In 1970, he was appointed President of the Pontifical Institute of Sacred Music and in 1971, he was appointed Pontifical Honorary Prelate.

Haberl devoted himself to composition and musicological work, composed numerous church music works and produced several theoretical writings and monographs on musicians of the Upper Palatinate.

Habeml died in Regensburg at the age of 79.

Publications 
 Die Inkarnationslehre des heiligen Albertus Magnus. Freiburg: Herder 1939, zugl.: Munich, Theol. Diss.
 Das Deutsche Amt und die Enzyklika Musicae sacrae disciplina. Regensburg: Pustet 1956

References

Further reading 
 Haberl, Ferdinand. In  (ed.): Große Bayerische Biographische Enzyklopädie. de Gruyter, K. G. Saur Verlag, Berlin/New York 2005.

Awards 
 1966:  in the music category
 1970:  of the Allgemeinen Cäcilien-Verbands
 1972: Bayerischer Verdienstorden
 1976: 
 1981: Bundesverdienstkreuz 1. Klasse

External links 
 
 Haberl, Ferdinand on BMLO

20th-century Roman Catholic theologians
20th-century German composers
20th-century hymnwriters
German classical organists
20th-century German musicologists
Academic staff of the University of Regensburg
Officers Crosses of the Order of Merit of the Federal Republic of Germany
1906 births
1985 deaths
People from Amberg-Sulzbach